June Rosalind Spencer CBE (born 14 June 1919) is an English actress best known for her role as Peggy Woolley in the BBC Radio 4 soap opera The Archers. Spencer played the character from 1950 to 1953, and again from 1962 to 2022.

Career
Born on 14 June 1919 in Nottingham, Spencer left Nottingham Girls' High School to join an amateur dramatic society and gained a London Guildhall School of Music and Drama certificate. She played the role of Peggy Woolley (née Perkins, formerly Archer) for over sixty years, beginning with the pilot episode in 1950, and ending on 31 July 2022, the sole survivor from the original cast. In 1953, she left the cast to look after her family, and the role of Peggy was taken over by Thelma Rogers.

Spencer later twice returned to the series to play another character, Rita Flynn, firstly from 1956 to 1958 and again from 1961. In 1962, Rogers left The Archers to return to the stage, and Spencer returned to the role of Peggy. She has also appeared on television on Songs of Praise and in the drama Doctors. Her retirement from The Archers was announced by the BBC on 8 August 2022. Her former co-star Graham Seed commended her for her "remarkable strength and resilience".

Personal life
Spencer was the guest on Desert Island Discs on 28 February 2010. Spencer spoke of the long-running Archers story line of Jack Woolley, her character's husband, suffering from Alzheimer's disease, and of her real-life husband of 59 years, Roger Brocksom, who died from the disease in 2001. They adopted two children, first their son David and then 30 months later, their daughter Ros.

Spencer turned 100 on 14 June 2019.

Honours
On 12 July 2012, Spencer was awarded an honorary degree by the University of Nottingham as a Doctor of Letters for her services to broadcasting. She was given a Lifetime Achievement award at the 2014 BBC Audio Drama Awards. She was appointed Officer of the Order of the British Empire (OBE) in 1991, and Commander of the Order of the British Empire (CBE) in the 2017 Birthday Honours for services to drama and charity.

See also
List of longest-serving soap opera actors

References

1919 births
Living people
People educated at Nottingham Girls' High School
Alumni of the Guildhall School of Music and Drama
The Archers
English centenarians
English soap opera actresses
English television actresses
Commanders of the Order of the British Empire
Actors from Nottingham
Women centenarians

British centenarians